Sugar 'n' Spice is a 1969 soul album released by Motown girl group Martha and the Vandellas on the Gordy (Motown) label. The album was released during a troubling and downward time for the lead singer, Martha Reeves, who was now heavily addicted to painkillers. Like many Motown albums of the late sixties, the album was produced by several in-house producers including Ashford & Simpson, Frank Wilson and Deke Richards.  Two tracks were in the can from Holland–Dozier–Holland ("I Can't Get Along Without You", and "I Hope You Had Better Luck Than I Did").  The modest R&B hit (#44), "Taking My Love (And Leaving Me)" is featured on this album. Although new member and former Velvelettes member Sandra Tilley is featured on the album cover, her vocals do not appear on the album. Instead, tracks were used with Rosalind Ashford, Lois Reeves with additional vocals accompanied by The Andantes and Syreeta Wright.

Track listing

Personnel
 Martha Reeves - lead vocals 
 Rosalind Ashford - backing vocals (side 2, tracks 1 and 6)
 Lois Reeves - backing vocals (side 2, tracks 1 and 6)
 The Andantes - backing vocals (side 1, tracks 1-3, 5-6; side 2, tracks 2, 4-6)
 Syreeta Wright - backing vocals (side 1, track 1)
 Valerie Simpson - backing vocals (side 1, track 4; side 2, track 3)
 Nickolas Ashford - backing vocals (side 1, track 4; side 2, track 3)
 The Funk Brothers - instrumentation

References

1969 albums
Gordy Records albums
Martha and the Vandellas albums